This article details the qualifying phase for golf at the 2024 Summer Olympics.  Sixty players for each of the men's and women's tournaments will qualify for Paris 2024 based on the official IGF world ranking list of 17 June 2024 (for men) and 24 June 2024 (for women). The top 15 world-ranked golf players will be selected by name and secure their Olympic places, respecting the four-player limit per NOC.  The remaining spots will be awarded to the players ranked beyond the top fifteen on the list with a maximum of two per NOC. Each of the five continental zones must enter at least one player across all golf tournaments under the principles of the Olympic movement and the rules governed by IGF. If unsatisfied with the entry selection method described above, the highest-ranked eligible player from the respective continental zone will allocate the vacant spot. As the host nation, France reserves a direct spot each in the men's and women's tournaments; if one or more French golfers qualify directly and regularly for the Games, their unused places will be reallocated to the next highest-ranked eligible golf player on the list. The IGF posts weekly lists of qualified male and female golf players based on their current standings.

Points are awarded to the players based on their final positions in each event, with performances in the events with stronger fields earning more points, based on a points distribution schedule approved by the IGF. Ranking points for each player accumulate over a two-year “rolling” period with the points awarded in the most recent thirteen-week period weighted at a full percentage of their original value. After the initial 13-week period, the points are devalued by 1.1% for each of the next 91 weeks before they drop entirely off the player's two-year record. The IGF Olympic ranking is ordered according to the average points that the players manage to accumulate over the applicable two-year period. Calculating the average points is to divide the total number of ranking points accumulated by the player in the number of tournaments in which he or she has competed during the two-year period.

Qualification summary
The following table outlines the NOCs qualified for the Olympic golf tournament with the number of golfers entered per NOC.

Qualified players
Legend

Men

Women

Notes

References

Qualification for the 2024 Summer Olympics
Qualification